Under One Flag is a now-defunct British record label from London, which aimed at a heavy metal audience, particularly a thrash metal audience. They were best known for re-releasing classic heavy metal albums, from the likes of Venom and Dark Angel, as well as some original releases from both bands and other heavy metal bands. Releases on vinyl by Under One Flag are sometimes still much desired collector's items.

Rise and fall
Under One Flag operated as a subsidiary label for Music for Nations, which later took over all Under One Flag's releases and most of the bands they signed. Music For Nations in turn is a subsidiary label of Zomba Music Group. The first official release Under One Flag published was "The Force", from English band Onslaught, in 1986. In this era the CD was making a shift entry in the music world. However, Under One Flag also kept on publishing heavy metal releases on vinyl and even cassette, besides on CD. They also published a number of compilation albums, under the name of "Speed Kills…", followed by any term that would relate to a then popular metal song.

In the meanwhile, they also released the third and fourth album of Swedish black metal band Bathory, which secured their status more and more. This enabled them to sign bands from the likes of Nuclear Assault and Forbidden. Under One Flag bought the rights to a number of previously released thrash metal albums, among which a significant part of the catalogue of Combat Records.  They also re-released the compilation of Death’s Fate: The Best of Death.

In the early 1990s, the popularity of heavy metal rose to a new level. Cult bands reached bigger audiences in the mainstream and parent label Music For Nations took over all activities and pulled the plug on Under One Flag. The last album published by Under One Flag was ‘’Progress of Decadence’’ from Overdose, in 1994. A total number of 232 releases were published by Under One Flag with a span of thirty one titles.

Catalogue

See also
List of record labels

References

Defunct record labels of the United Kingdom
Record labels established in 1986
Record labels disestablished in 1994
Heavy metal record labels
1986 establishments in England
1994 disestablishments in England